Gianni Minervini (born 21 October 1966) is an Italian former swimmer who competed in the 1984 Summer Olympics, in the 1988 Summer Olympics, and in the 1992 Summer Olympics.

References

1966 births
Living people
Swimmers from Rome
Italian male swimmers
Italian male breaststroke swimmers
Olympic swimmers of Italy
Swimmers at the 1984 Summer Olympics
Swimmers at the 1988 Summer Olympics
Swimmers at the 1992 Summer Olympics
World Aquatics Championships medalists in swimming
European Aquatics Championships medalists in swimming
Mediterranean Games gold medalists for Italy
Mediterranean Games bronze medalists for Italy
Swimmers at the 1987 Mediterranean Games
Swimmers at the 1991 Mediterranean Games
Universiade medalists in swimming
Mediterranean Games medalists in swimming
Universiade silver medalists for Italy
Medalists at the 1985 Summer Universiade
20th-century Italian people
21st-century Italian people